Lipinia infralineolata is a species of skink found in Indonesia.

References

Lipinia
Reptiles described in 1873
Taxa named by Albert Günther